Johan Antoon Reinier Alex Maria van Hooff (born 15 May 1936) is a Dutch biologist best known for his research involving primates. He was professor of comparative physiology at Utrecht University from 1980 to 2001.

Career
Van Hooff was born in Arnhem on 15 May 1936. During his childhood he spent large amounts of time at Royal Burgers' Zoo, which had been founded by his grandfather Johan Burgers. The zoo was later taken over by his parents.

Van Hooff studied biology at Utrecht University. After reading the book The Expression of the Emotions in Man and Animals of Charles Darwin he decided he wished to do research on the facial expressions of primates. Not having an opportunity to do so at Utrecht University, he was helped by professor of comparative physiology Sven Dijkgraaf to study at the University of Oxford under Nikolaas Tinbergen and Desmond Morris. In 1971 he obtained his doctorate with a dissertation titled:"Aspecten van het sociale gedrag en de communicatie bij humane en hogere niet-humane primaten" (Aspects of the social behaviour and communication of human and higher non-human primates) under Nico Frijda and Dijkgraaf. During the 1960s the parents of Van Hooff needed more help with running the zoo, as Jan was studying in the United Kingdom his brother  helped and later became director.

In 1966 Van Hooff was involved in research concerning socialization of a large group of chimpanzees held at a United States Air Force research institute. Due to Van Hooff's involvement a group of chimpanzees was added to Royal Burgers' Zoo in 1971. This latter group was intensively researched by Frans de Waal, van Hooff's first PhD student.

In 1973 Van Hooff was named lector of comparative physiology at Utrecht University. In 1980 he became professor. He retired in 2001.

He was elected a member of the Royal Netherlands Academy of Arts and Sciences in 1988. Van Hooff is an Officer in the Order of Orange-Nassau.

A video published in May 2016 showing the emotional reunion of Van Hooff with Mama, a 59-year-old chimpanzee with terminal illness at the Royal Burgers' Zoo, attracted over 10 million views. Mama was the oldest chimpanzee in the Netherlands and had known Van Hooff since 1972. Upon recognising Van Hooff, Mama broke into a wide grin and embraced him. Van Hooff was able to feed and comfort Mama, who had previously refused food. Mama died a week after their reunion.

References

1936 births
Living people
Alumni of the University of Oxford
Dutch physiologists
Members of the Royal Netherlands Academy of Arts and Sciences
Officers of the Order of Orange-Nassau
People from Arnhem
Primatologists
Utrecht University alumni
Academic staff of Utrecht University
20th-century Dutch people